After Kenya's independence on December 12, 1963, the United States immediately recognized the new nation and moved to establish diplomatic relations. The embassy in Nairobi was established December 12, 1963—Kenya’s independence day—with Laurence C. Vass as chargé d’affaires ad interim pending the appointment of an ambassador.

Ambassadors

Notes

See also
Kenya – United States relations
Foreign relations of Kenya
Ambassadors of the United States

References
United States Department of State: Background notes on Kenya

External links
 United States Department of State: Chiefs of Mission for Kenya
 United States Department of State: Kenya
 United States Embassy in Kenya

Kenya
United States